Andrew Dawes  (February 7, 1940 – October 30, 2022) was a Canadian violinist. He was known for his performances with the Orford String Quartet.

Early life and education
Dawes was born in High River, Alberta. His violin teachers included Clayton Hare and Murray Adaskin, and he studied with Lorand Fenyves at the Conservatoire de Geneve.

Career
Dawes was first violinist of the Toronto-based Orford String Quartet throughout its existence from 1965 to 1991. The group toured through North America in 1984. He also performed with the Tokyo String Quartet in 1995.

Dawes was a Professor of Music at  the University of Toronto Faculty of Music. He was Professor Emeritus The University of British Columbia School of Music. He was a Distinguished Visiting Scholar and Catherine Thornhill Steele Chair in Music at McGill University.  He was a member of the board of directors of the Saint James Music Academy, and a director of the Vancouver Academy of Music's Chamber Music Institute.

Dawes served as a juror on a number of music competitions, including the London International String Quartet competition, the Coleman Chamber Music Competition, and the Fischoff National Chamber Music Competition. He was chairman of the Banff International String Quartet Competition from 1989 to 2004.

In 2013, the National Film Board of Canada produced a video biography written and directed by Lisa Jackson of Dawes' life entitled Dynamic Range.

As of 2022, the 1770 GB Guadagnini violin that Dawes had played is now known as the 'Dawes, de Long Tearse' Guadagnini. It is currently played by Robert Uchida.

Death
Dawes died after battling prostate cancer on October 30, 2022, at the age of 82.

Awards
 2013 Governor General Performing Arts Award for Lifetime Achievement in Classical Music
 Appointed Member of the Order of Canada in 1991
 The Dorothy Somerset Award for Excellence in Performance and Development
 The Queen Elizabeth II Golden Jubilee Medal
 Juno Awards: 11 nominations and 3 wins
 Chalmers National Music Award
 The Canada Council Molson Prize
 1964 Prix de Virtuosité from the Conservatoire de Musique de Genève
 2013 Governor General's Performing Arts Award for Lifetime Artistic Achievement

Recordings
Notable Dawes recordings include
 Beethoven Complete Sonatas for Piano & Violin with Jane Coop
 Beethoven The Complete Quartets with the Orford String Quartet
 Mozart String Quartets with the Orford String Quartet

References

External links
 
 Article at thecanadianencyclopedia.ca
 

1940 births
2022 deaths
People from High River
Members of the Order of Canada
Canadian classical violinists
Male classical violinists
Musicians from Alberta
Governor General's Performing Arts Award winners
21st-century classical violinists
21st-century Canadian male musicians
20th-century Canadian violinists and fiddlers
21st-century Canadian violinists and fiddlers
Canadian male violinists and fiddlers
20th-century classical violinists
20th-century Canadian male musicians